There are at least two public school districts in the United States named Hudson City School District.  These include:

 Hudson City School District (New York); Hudson, New York 
 Hudson City School District (Ohio); Hudson, Ohio